Anju Joseph or Anju Brahmasmi is an Indian playback singer in Malayalam cinema. She started her career as a playback singer in Malayalam movie Doctor Love in 2011

Early life and family 
Anju Joseph was one among the contestants of Asianet Idea Star Singer Season 4  and she became the third runner up of the show. She did her schooling in St. Joseph's Public School and St.Antony's Public School Kanjirappally and completed her degree in English Literature at St. Teresa's College Ernakulam. She also got a Masters in the same from Maharaja's College Ernakulam.

Career
She started her career for films like Doctor Love, Alamara, Avarude Raavukal, Ormakalil Oru Manjukaalam, C/O Saira Banu. Another career break in her life was in 2016, when she released an a cappella version of the song Dheewara from the famous film Bahubali. She was personally called and congratulated and This created a major trend in Telugu industry and her team was invited to perform for the Cinemaa Awards in Hyderabad.

Films

Discography

As a Singer

References

External links
 

Year of birth missing (living people)
Living people
Actresses in Malayalam cinema
People from Kottayam
Singers from Kerala